Ouvrage Fressinéa, also known as Fraisinéa or Frassinéa is a lesser work (petit ouvrage) of the Maginot Line's Alpine extension, the Alpine Line. It is associated with the gros ouvrage of Rimplas, the first Maginot fortification to be constructed anywhere. Fressinéa was built between November 1930 and April 1934, accommodating 30 soldiers under a lieutenant with two months of provisions. The initial contractor was Pioljeux. Construction was finished by Thorrand et Cie for 1.7 million francs.

Description 
Block 1 (entry): one machine gun embrasure.
Block 2 (observation): one machine gun embrasure.
Block 3 (infantry): one heavy twin machine gun embrasure and one heavy machine gun/47mm anti-tank gun embrasure.

Fressinéa is located on the D2205 road along the Tinée river.  The post controls movement along the road and valley towards Nice.

Fressinéa was held by the French Army until 1970 when it was sold to the commune of Rimplas. The fort is under the care of Les amis de l'ouvrage Maginot de la Frassiné. It is open to the public in spring, summer and fall months.

See also 
 List of Alpine Line ouvrages

References

Bibliography 
Allcorn, William. The Maginot Line 1928-45. Oxford: Osprey Publishing, 2003. 
Kaufmann, J.E. and Kaufmann, H.W. Fortress France: The Maginot Line and French Defenses in World War II, Stackpole Books, 2006. 
Kaufmann, J.E., Kaufmann, H.W., Jancovič-Potočnik, A. and Lang, P. The Maginot Line: History and Guide, Pen and Sword, 2011. 
Mary, Jean-Yves; Hohnadel, Alain; Sicard, Jacques. Hommes et Ouvrages de la Ligne Maginot, Tome 1. Paris, Histoire & Collections, 2001.  
Mary, Jean-Yves; Hohnadel, Alain; Sicard, Jacques. Hommes et Ouvrages de la Ligne Maginot, Tome 4 - La fortification alpine. Paris, Histoire & Collections, 2009.  
Mary, Jean-Yves; Hohnadel, Alain; Sicard, Jacques. Hommes et Ouvrages de la Ligne Maginot, Tome 5. Paris, Histoire & Collections, 2009.

External links 
 Amis de l'Ouvrage Maginot de la Frassninéa
 Fressinéa (petit ouvrage de) at fortiff.be 
 Ouvrage de la Frassinea at Les Sentinelles des Alpes 
 Informations, location and photos of Ouvrage de Frassinea at wikimaginot.eu 
 

FRES
Maginot Line
Alpine Line
World War II museums in France